M.J. Hans Taihuttu (born 1909, date of death unknown) was an Indonesian football forward who played for the Dutch East Indies in the 1938 FIFA World Cup. He also played for VV Jong Ambon Batavia.

References

External links
 

1909 births
Year of death missing
Indonesian footballers
Indonesia international footballers
Association football forwards
VV Jong Ambon Batavia players
1938 FIFA World Cup players